São Jerônimo is a municipality in the state of Rio Grande do Sul, Brazil.

It is a municipality that is part of the watershed, the Jacuí River.

See also
List of municipalities in Rio Grande do Sul

References

Municipalities in Rio Grande do Sul